Brand Peak is a sharp snow-covered peak located  east-southeast of the Eternity Range and  northwest of Mount Duemler, in Palmer Land. It was mapped by the United States Geological Survey in 1974, and named by the Advisory Committee on Antarctic Names for Timothy Brand, a United States Antarctic Research Program biologist at Palmer Station in 1974.

References 

Mountains of Palmer Land